The Blue Dragon Film Award for Best Music is one of the awards that is presented annually at the Blue Dragon Film Awards by Sports Chosun, which is typically held at the end of the year.

Winners

References

General references

External links 
  
 

Blue Dragon Film Awards
Film music awards